Bijin Park is an urban park in the Yubei District of Chongqing. It is one of the largest parks in Lianglu region of Yubei, Chongqing, and is one of the facade parks of Chongqing Municipal. The park contains a lake of about 4.3 hectares, on which people can row boats. The park is also a major base to present the traditional folk culture of Chongqing, the Ba-Yu culture. It is also home to the memorial of Wang Pu, a communist educator who was killed by the KMT in Chongqing in 1949.

Yubei District
Parks in Chongqing